Baya may refer to:

Ethnic groups
 Gbaya people, ethnic group in the Central African Republic

People
 Baya (artist) (1931–1998), Algerian artist
 Baya Rahouli (born 1979), Algerian athlete
 Kara Baya, member of the pan-African parliament
 Raymond Ramazani Baya (1943–2019), Democratic Republic of Congo politician
 Zoubeir Baya (born 1971), Tunisian football player
 Paulo Baya, Brazilian footballer

Biology

Animals 
 Baya (leafhopper), a leafhopper genus in the tribe Erythroneurini
 The baya weaver, a bird species found in South and Southeast Asia
 The Finn's baya, a bird species found in the Ganges valley of India

Plants 
 Baya, a synonym for the Portuguese baga (grape) variety

Places
 Baya, Côte d'Ivoire, a village in Côte d'Ivoire
 Baya, Ganassi, an inactive volcano in Lanao del Sur province, Philippines
 Baya, Iran, a village in Kurdistan Province, Iran
 Baya, Qazvin, a village in Qazvin Province, Iran
 Baya, Mali, a commune in the Cercle of Yanfolila in the Sikasso Region of Mali
 Baya, Togo, a village in the Bassar Prefecture in the Kara Region of north-western Togo
 Baya, Sar-e Pol, Afghanistan
 Baya river, the name of a river in the Begusarai district of the Bihar state, India
 Baya, an alternative name for Kipoi, Ioannina, a village in Greece

Beverages
Baya, a rice wine from the northern Philippines also known as tapuy

Military
 USS Baya (SS-318), a U.S. Navy submarine

Music
 "Baya al Ward" (song), a 2006 single by Amal Hijazi
 Baya al Ward, a 2006 album by Amal Hijazi
 Haat baya, a folk instrument

See also
 Bayah (disambiguation)
 Bayas
 Bayas River